Paramoltkia is a genus of flowering plants belonging to the family Boraginaceae.

Its native range is Western Balkan Peninsula.

Species
Species:
 Paramoltkia doerfleri (Wettst.) Greuter & Burdet

References

Boraginaceae
Boraginaceae genera